This is a partial list of affiliate stations of the DuMont Television Network, which operated in the United States from 1946 to 1956. At its peak in 1954, DuMont was affiliated with around 200 TV stations. In its later years, DuMont was carried mostly on poorly watched UHF channels or had only secondary affiliations on VHF stations. The DuMont affiliation ending dates listed here are somewhat tentative in several cases; DuMont ended most operations on April 1, 1955, and honored network commitments until August 1956.

Many stations in the early years of television affiliated with more than one network. There were not enough local stations in most cities for each of the four major networks to have an affiliate, leading to the four networks (as well as a number of smaller networks) to fight for air time. Local TV stations were free to "cherry-pick" which programs they would broadcast. Many of DuMont's "affiliates" carried very little DuMont programming, choosing to air one or two more popular programs (such as Life Is Worth Living, which was aired by 169 stations during the 1953–1954 season) and/or sports programming on the weekends. Few stations carried the full DuMont program line-up.

DuMont's advertising revenues depended on being able to be viewed nationwide. As a result, the company made affiliation agreements which have been described as "a crazy patchwork of deals". In many cities, DuMont was affiliated with more than one TV station in order to get more of its programming cleared for broadcast. No definitive list of affiliated stations from 1946 to 1956 exists, and many sources contradict one another.

DuMont's owned-and-operated stations are highlighted in yellow. The Paramount owned-and-operated stations, which did not carry DuMont programs but were ruled DuMont O&Os by the FCC, are shown in pink.

Alabama

Alaska

Arizona

Arkansas

California

Colorado

Connecticut

Delaware

District of Columbia

Florida

Georgia

Hawaii

Idaho

Illinois

Indiana

Iowa

Kansas

Kentucky

Louisiana

Maine

Maryland

Massachusetts

Michigan

Minnesota

Mississippi

Missouri

Montana

Nebraska

Nevada

New Jersey

New Mexico

New York

North Carolina

North Dakota

Ohio

Oklahoma

Oregon

Pennsylvania

Puerto Rico

Rhode Island

South Carolina

South Dakota

Tennessee

Texas

Utah

Virginia

Washington

West Virginia

Wisconsin

Wyoming

Footnotes
† Ending dates tentative; source does not give a date for the end of affiliation with DuMont or states affiliation ended at the end of the network operations. DuMont cancelled most network programs beginning 1 April 1955, and honored network commitments until 6 August 1956.

Affiliates
DuMont Television Network